Wolfgang April (born Bogusław Kwiecień; born 3 September 1959) is a Polish-German former professional footballer who played as a defender.

References

External links
 

Living people
1959 births
People from Kluczbork
Polish emigrants to Germany
Polish footballers
German footballers
Association football defenders
Stal Mielec players
Gwardia Koszalin players
Eintracht Frankfurt players
SpVgg Bayreuth players
CE Sabadell FC footballers
German expatriate footballers
German expatriate sportspeople in Spain
Expatriate footballers in Spain